Omar El Kaddouri (Riffian-Berber: ⵄⵎⴰⵔ ⵍⵇⴰⴷⵓⵔⵉ; born 21 August 1990) is a professional footballer who plays as a midfielder or a winger for Greek Super League club PAOK. Born in Belgium, he represents Morocco at international level.

Club career

Early career
Born in Belgium to Riffian-Moroccan parents, El Kaddouri began his early career at K. Diegem Sport. He subsequently moved to Anderlecht after being scouted by their youth system. During the Torneo di Viareggio in 2007, he was scouted by Italian football club Brescia who signed him in 2008.

He played two seasons with the Brescia youth team, managing a first team appearance when he came on as a substitute against Livorno on 30 March 2009, aged just 18. Due to a lack of first team opportunities, he was sent out to Lega Pro side Südtirol, where he managed 32 appearances, scoring two goals and assisting a further 10.

Brescia
During 2011–12, El Kaddouri returned to Brescia, who decided to establish him in the centre midfield. On 3 October 2011, he scored the second goal in a defeat of Cittadella. On 5 March 2012 he scored his fifth goal of the season for le Rondinelle against Gubbio, on an assist of Jonathas. He concluded the season with 38 appearances and 7 goals.

Napoli

On 24 August 2012 El Kaddouri officially signed with Napoli under a co-ownership agreement for €2 million.

He officially debuted with the Neapolitans on 20 September as a starter in a Europa League match against Swedish side AIK Fotboll; his Serie A debut was on 2 December, in a home game against Pescara. He collected 7 appearances in Serie A, with 14 in total throughout the season.

On 20 June 2013 Napoli acquired the second half of his contract from Brescia.

Torino

On 11 July 2013 El Kaddouri was loaned to Torino with the right to redeem half of his contract in co-ownership. He made his debut on 17 August in the third round of Coppa Italia, a 1–2 defeat against Pescara, substituting Alexander Farnerud at halftime. On 24 November he scored his first two goals for Torino during a 4–1 win against Catania. On 17 February 2014 he scored the final goal in a 3–1 win away at Verona, after providing two assists on the earlier goals.

In the league El Kaddouri collected 29 appearances and 5 goals. At the end of the season Torino opted to acquire 50% of his contract, however, Napoli exercised the right redeem his contract in full as stipulated. On 1 July 2014 he was reloaned to Torino with a buyout clause. On 7 February 2015 he scored his first goal of the season during an away fixture against Verona; the game ended 3–1 in favour of the Granata.

Return to Napoli

On 25 June 2015 El Kaddouri's contract was not redeemed by Torino and he returned to Naples.

Empoli
On 31 January 2017, during the winter transfer window, El Kaddouri has officially joined Empoli, moving from Napoli on a three-and-a-half-year contract, until 30 June 2021.

PAOK

On August 24, 2017, PAOK announced the signing of the Moroccan midfielder, who signed a four-year contract with the team. On 14 April 2018, he scored his first goal in the Super League, in a 3–1 home victory over Panionios. In his first year in the team of Thessaloniki, he reached the conquest of the Greek Cup. The final between PAOK and AEK was held at the OAKA stadium, with "Dikefalos tou Vorras" prevailing with a score of 2–0.
The following season he clearly had a more active role in the team and took many opportunities from Răzvan Lucescu, the coach of PAOK. However, during the winter transfer window, there were strong rumors of a possible transfer to Parma, Italy, but after a suggestion from Lucescu and Ivan Savvidis, he eventually stayed at the club, and in the season finale celebrated the double, in addition to the championship, also won the cup.
In the 2019-2020 season, he was one of the main selections for the starting lineup, while 2020-2021 was his most productive year with the Thessaloniki team, participating in 39 games and offering 3 goals and 6 assists. In the final he celebrated the conquest of the Greek cup with PAOK. PAOK in the final prevailed with a score of 2-1 over OSFP. This was the fourth overall title of El Kantouri with the team of PAOK. He did not play in the final.
On June 16, 2021, PAOK and El Kantouri agreed to extend their contract for another two years, with the prospect of an extension for another year, where, according to information, it will be activated automatically if the participation limit of 50% of the total number of games will be reached. given by PAOK in the 2022–23 season.
El Kaddouri entered the season with a muscle injury, after the first matches in Europe with Bohemian F.C. and Rijeka in which he was present. He left him out of the first two matches of the Conference League groups with Lincoln City F.C. and Slovan Bratislava as well as in the first five matches of the Championship with PAS at home, Asteras away, Panetolikos away, AEK inside and OFI away. He returned in October and did a series of races. He played in seven consecutive Championship games and three European games but in December a new muscle injury came. He left him out for two months, from 10 consecutive Championship matches, the final of the Conference League groups but also the two matches of the Cup quarterfinals with AEK. He returned at the end of February to play four Championship games at the end of the regular season, but only 90 minutes with Lamia while he also had short appearances in the two matches against Midtjylland and in the first with K.A.A. Gent. However, he lost the rematch with the Belgians, with a new problem that took almost 20 days to overcome. El Kaddouri returned at the beginning of April again at the disposal of Răzvan Lucescu, played 63 minutes in the playoff match with Panathinaikos and in the second half of the match in Marseille, of course scoring PAOK's goal against Marseille. Report so far? 24 games of all competitions, 12 only as a starter and 25 absences that will of course become more through the period of three weeks that will be left out again. The truth is that PAOK used to play without El Kantouri but that does not mean that it is not a significant loss. The quality, the experience but also the fact that he has one of the biggest contracts in the team make him valuable but… the fractures do not count on them. We remind you that El Kaddouri, who has a contract next season with Dikefalos, last year counted 39 games of all competitions, a number that of course does not manage to reach this year while in the 2019-20 season he counted 29 games. Recording the total of his games and absences in his five years at PAOK, the Moroccan lost 38.58% of his team's games for various reasons. Mainly of course due to injuries and in less cases due to cards or staying on the bench.

International career
El Kaddouri was part of the Belgium U21 team.  He scored his first goal for them on 14 November 2011 against England in a match part of the European Under-21 qualifiers in 2013. In July 2012, he participated in the Olympic Games in London with Morocco, making two appearances.

El Kaddouri then played for the Moroccan national team, making his debut 14 August 2013 in a friendly against Burkina Faso. He scored his first goal on 23 May 2014 in a 4–0 friendly win over Mozambique.

Career statistics

Club

International
Scores and results list Morocco's goal tally first.

Honours
PAOK
Super League Greece: 2018–19
Greek Cup: 2017–18, 2018–19, 2020–21; runner-up: 2021–22

References

External links

 Career profile (from aic.it)
 
 

1990 births
Living people
Riffian people
Moroccan footballers
Morocco international footballers
R.S.C. Anderlecht players
Brescia Calcio players
F.C. Südtirol players
S.S.C. Napoli players
Torino F.C. players
Empoli F.C. players
PAOK FC players
Serie A players
Serie B players
Super League Greece players
Moroccan expatriate footballers
Expatriate footballers in Belgium
Expatriate footballers in Italy
Expatriate footballers in Greece
Belgian sportspeople of Moroccan descent
Belgian expatriate footballers
Olympic footballers of Morocco
Footballers at the 2012 Summer Olympics
Belgium under-21 international footballers
Belgian footballers
Belgium youth international footballers
2017 Africa Cup of Nations players
Association football midfielders
Footballers from Brussels
K. Diegem Sport players
Belgian expatriate sportspeople in Greece
Belgian expatriate sportspeople in Italy
Moroccan expatriate sportspeople in Belgium
Moroccan expatriate sportspeople in Greece
Moroccan expatriate sportspeople in Italy